Andrew Holmes or Andy Holmes may refer to:

 Andrew Holmes (army officer) (died 1814), American army officer in the War of 1812
 Andrew Holmes (soldier), U.S. army soldier accused of having committed war crimes in Afghanistan
 Andrew Fernando Holmes (1797–1860), Canadian physician and academic
 Andrew Holmes, California National Guardsman and plaintiff in Holmes v. California National Guard
 Andrew Bruce Holmes (born 1943), Australian scientist
 Andy Holmes (1959–2010), British rower
 Andy Holmes (footballer) (born 1969), English footballer
 Andrew O. Holmes (1906–1965), Associate Justice of the Tennessee Supreme Court